Tora (Assamese: তৰা) is an Assamese language children's film directed by Jahnu Barua and produced by the Children's Film Society, India. The film was released in 2004. The film received the  Best Children's Film award in the 51st National Film Awards for the year 2003.

Synopsis
The film centred on two neighboring families in a village in Assam. The two families share a very amicable relation. Tora, the protagonist is a seven-year-old girl with her parents Purna (father) and Jonaki (mother). Naba and Daba are two brothers of the other family with their ailing bedridden mother. One day a dispute arises over a piece of land. Whilst the adults quarrel, Tora's voice is the only significant factor that can resolve the matter.

Film dedicated to Dhemaji victims
Jahnu Barua, the director of Tora, dedicated his film on 19 August 2004 to the children killed in the 2004 Dhemaji bombing carried out by ULFA militants on Independence Day.

Casts
Mrigakshi
Anup Hazarika
Indrani Chetia
Pratibha Choudhury
Atul Pasoni
Dina Baishya
Abatosh Bhuyan
Sukanya Kharghoria
Arun Hazarika

Awards
National award - Best Children Film (2003)

See also
Jollywood

References

External links
 Tora on IMDb
Rupaliparda

2004 films
2000s children's films
Indian children's films
Films set in Assam
Best Children's Film National Film Award winners
Films directed by Jahnu Barua
2000s Assamese-language films